Birds Bakery, is a bakery chain based in Derby, England.  the chain has 65 outlets across the Midlands.

History
Birds was founded by Frank, Thomas and Reginald Bird after they purchased Peach’s bakery and pork butchers on Upper Dale Road in 1919. Eight years later they opened their second shop on Normanton Road and continued to expand across the town. When the last of the three brothers, Frank Bird, died in 1951, the bakery was taken over by two more members of the family, Reg and Paul Bird.

In 1971, production was moved to a new building at Ascot Drive with their previous headquarters being demolished, and by 1972 Birds employed 300 people and operated 18 retail shops. In 2017 the 60th Birds shop opened in Sinfin and the chain is continuing to expand, with 65 outlets .

Controversy

In 2020, Megan Metcalfe, who was the Store Manager of the Radcliffe-on-Trent branch, was sacked for gross misconduct after she accepted cash payments from elderly customers without bank cards during the COVID-19 pandemic. This led to a petition being created calling for Ms Metcalfe, an employee with over 40 years of service to Birds, to be re-instated or compensated, which as of  has over 13,000 signatures.

References

External links
 Website
 Companies House listing

1919 establishments in England
Bakeries of the United Kingdom
British companies established in 1919
Companies based in Derby
English brands
Food and drink companies established in 1919
Retail companies of the United Kingdom
Retail companies established in 1919